Nizhnyaya Tura railway station is a railway station located in Nizhnyaya Tura, Sverdlovsk Oblast, Russia.

The station is in the western part of Nizhnyaya Tura. It has a stone two-storey building with a large waiting room built in the constructivist style in the middle of the 20th century. There are several outbuildings, including an early-20th century water tower. Roads link the station to industrial enterprises in the city.

References 

Railway stations in Sverdlovsk Oblast
Railway stations in the Russian Empire opened in 1906